Dr. Hersh Chadha (born 1957 in India)  OPM (Harvard Business School), ARPS, discovered he was happiest when alone, traveling with his camera and thoughts. To date he has visited 92 countries and 279 cities.

Publications
Dr. Hersh Chadha has authored Elements and Elements I, II and III, a series of photographic books that capture nature in its various moods. The proceeds from the sales of these books go to the WWF. Elements can be found in the libraries of the hallowed centres of learning, Harvard and Stanford, where examples of his work also hang on the walls. His images are also in the possession of a number of eminent personalities – including several members of royalty. Hersh Chadha: Visions of Nature, a book that, as its title suggests, contains a selection of his images of nature, followed the Elements series. Next up was With Ink & Film, which takes the reader on a journey round the world and features thought-provoking quotations in addition to his fine imagery. In 2011, Prof. Chadha produced three new photographic books containing stunning examples of his art: Masterpiece, which highlights some 235 fascinating places he’s visited; Y.O.U., which celebrates the beauty of women; and Patterns, which examines the similarity between the patterns of nature and patterns of man.

His book Masterpiece now features in the 2015 edition of the Limca Book of Records under the category, "Photo book of most cities by the same photographer", for having launched a photo book titled Masterpiece, covering 235 cities.

In 2013, Dr. Chadha commissioned three of his photography internship students from Kyiv, Ukraine to complete different photographic projects, which involved photography, e-books, multimedia presentation, coffee table book, and exhibits. The first book, Urban Beauty by Andrey Kvasov, covers major cities of Europe bringing out their beauty in urban and traditional architecture, people, bridges, and transportation. The second book, The Essence by Maria Savoskula, is about Cell photography and features the bright and unpredictable images of plant, animal and human cells as an abstract art.  The third book, India By Foot, by Sergey Polezhaka, features images taken while traveling across the length and breadth of India in a limited time frame and portrays India in its different shades and nuances.

Dr. Hersh Chadha is an Associate of the Royal Photographic Society (ARPS), awarded for exhibiting a high degree of proficiency and demonstrating technical and visual competence in photography. He has also been actively involved with World Press Photo. He is a man of many facets. He resided inDubai,  in the UAE, where he ran a global network of business activities, and is an avid reader, keen economist and collector of objects d’art.

Concerns
His uncompromising concern for the environment and the way man ravages it has made him focus on critical issues such as the preservation of wildlife, the protection of rain forests, the ozone layer and pollution. He has worked with a number of wildlife agencies concerned with conservation of Arabian wildlife – including The Arabian Leopard Trust and the Environmental Research and Wildlife Development Agency (ERWDA) – and has made significant photographic contributions to these agencies.

Feeling for people in need, Dr. Hersh Chadha considers philanthropy as a necessary tool in contributing towards human development. Education is one of the focal points in the framework of his philanthropic activity. His Internship Program in Dubai provides opportunities for professional training, to students from all round the world, in the field of Digital Photography and Photographic Modeling. Dr. Chadha has interned over 95 students in photography and modelling from various countries. The Hersh Chadha foundation has sponsored the education of over 200 students worldwide across multiple universities, by providing them with scholarship grants. In addition, he contributes to various charities and supports upcoming sportsmen and sportswomen. In addition, he contributes to various charities and supports up and coming sportsmen and women.

Far and Wide
His desire to establish photography as an art form saw him institute an annual award at the prestigious Institute of Journalism at Taras Shevchenko Kyiv University. He was a visiting professor there, as well as at the American University of Central Asia in Bishkek, Kyrgyzstan; the Kyrgyzstan National University; and the Institute of Foreign Languages at the International University of Kyrgyzstan. In 2009 the Taras Shevchenko National University celebrated its 175th anniversary and, on this occasion, Dr. Hersh Chadha was bestowed the coveted title of Honorary Professor. In Feb 2014, The Kyiv National University of Technologies and Design awarded Honorary Doctorate to Dr. Hersh Chadha. In Nov. 2016, The American University of Central Asia (AUCA), Bishkek, awarded Dr. Chadha the title of Honorary Professor.

Dr. Chadha has provided crucial support for the establishment of infrastructure for the students of the Journalism and Mass Communications program at the media lab of the new campus of American University of Central Asia (AUCA) in Bishkek, Kyrgyzstan, and set up a state of the art photography lab at the Kyiv National University of Technologies and Design in Ukraine. He has provided financial grants to several students of the faculty of Journalism at the AUCA. Dr. Chadha has also helped the Maldives National University (MNU) to establish close links with the American University of Sharjah, by funding the study trip of the Maldives National University faculty to the UAE, and helped MNU by sponsoring a faculty member of the Journalism Department for a period of 6 months.

In 2015, Dr. Chadha in association with Department of Photo Journalism at the American University Central Asia in Bishkek, Kyrgyzstan organized a photography competition among the students and nominated the winner Talgat Subanaliev for the photography expedition to Antarctica. In February 2016, Talgat undertook a 10 days voyage across Antarctica along with researchers and photographers from all over the world . The trip was organized and fully sponsored by Dr. Hersh Chadha.

As he never tires of saying, ‘Life is beautiful and photography only enhances it.’ Indeed, ‘Have camera, will travel,’ seems to be Dr. Hersh Chadha’s eloquent mission statement.

On 19 October 2016, five of his pictures of flowers were carried to the International Space Station by the crew of Expedition 49/50.

On 1 June 2017, Dr. Chadha was the honorary guest at the ceremony of welcoming cosmonauts back from the mission, which took place at the YU.A. Gagarin Research and Test Cosmonaut Training Center in Star City, Moscow. He was given a certificate, confirming that five of his photographs were delivered to the International Space Station on 21 October 2016 and continue to be displayed in the ISS. Dr. Hersh Chadha is the first person who organised a photography exhibition in Space.

In June 2017, Dr. Chadha was invited to become a member of the Constituent Assembly of The Global Council for Tolerance and Peace. In July 2017, he attended meetings at the United Nations as a member of the delegation for signing the MOU between the Global Council for Tolerance and Peace and the United Nations.

On 2 August 2017, Dr. Chadha gave the keynote speech at The World Communication Association (WCA)’s biennial conference held at the American University of Central Asia (AUCA) in Bishkek, Kyrgyzstan. The topic of the conference was "World Conflicts and Disasters: Communication, Culture and Resolution".

Dr. Hersh Chadha donated money towards the construction of a "Sakura Garden" at the Kyiv National University of Technology and Design (KNUTD) in Kyiv, Ukraine, which will consist of 21 Sakura trees for the benefit of their students.  On 18 September 2017, he planted a Sakura tree in the park of KNUTD to launch this project.

Memberships
 The 1001: A Nature Trust (WWF International)
 American Society of Media Photographers (ASMP)
 The Harvard Alumni Society of the UAE
 The Stanford Business School Alumni Association
 The Royal Photographic Society of Great Britain
 Honorary Member of the Union of Photo Artists, Ukraine
 The Managing Committee, The Delhi Private School, Dubai
 International Who’s Who of Professionals
 The National Geographic Society
 The University Council of American University of Central Asia, Bishkek, Kyrgyzstan

References

External links 
 hershchadha.com
 hwcphoto.com

Living people
Indian nature photographers
1957 births
Harvard Business School alumni